Kübelwagen is a German word, contracted from Kübelsitzwagen (literally: 'bucket-seat car') – originally military slang for doorless cross-country and field-cars, fitted with bucket seats, to prevent riders from falling out of the vehicle – became a household word similar in meaning to the english "jeep".

Kübelwagen is mostly associated with the Volkswagen type 82 Kübelwagen, but it may also refer to:

Kübelwagen vehicles
 Einheits-PKW der Wehrmacht – German WW II military cross-country cars
 Intermeccanica VW Kübelwagen replica
 Mercedes-Benz 170 VK Kübelwagen
 Mercedes-Benz W142/III and W142/IV Kübelwagen
 Steyr 1500A and Steyr 2000A V8, 4x4 field-cars (18,850 made from 1941–1945)
 Tatra 57K Kübelwagen
 Trabant 601 Kübel and Tramp models
 Volkswagen Kübelwagen
 Volkswagen Type 181 'Thing'

See also
 Military light utility vehicle